, also known by the Mondo Macabro DVD title Female Prisoner: Caged!, is a 1983 Japanese women in prison film in Nikkatsu's Roman porno series, directed by Masaru Konuma and starring Mina Asami.

Plot
Masayo is a rebellious inmate at a female prison managed by a sadistic warden. The warden develops a special interest in Masayo and makes plans to have her subdued.

Cast
Mina Asami: Masayo
Ryoko Watanabe: Kishiko, prison guard
Nami Matsukawa: Saeko
Shigeru Muroi: Miwa
Keiko Aikawa: Shigeko
Kiwako Izumi: Prison warden

External links
 

1983 films
Films directed by Masaru Konuma
1980s Japanese-language films
Women in prison films
Japanese prison films
1980s prison films
Nikkatsu Roman Porno
Lesbian-related films
Japanese LGBT-related films
1980s Japanese films